Antigo is a city in and the county seat of Langlade County, Wisconsin, United States. The population was 8,100 at the 2020 census. Antigo is the center of a farming and lumbering district, and its manufactures consist principally of lumber, chairs, furniture, sashes, doors and blinds, hubs and spokes, and other wood products.

History 
The name "Antigo" comes from the Ojibwe name for the river that flows through the area, "Nequi-Antigo-sebi" meaning "spring river" or "evergreen."

The city was founded in 1876 by Francis A. Deleglise, accompanied by George Eckart. The log cabin in which Deleglise lived is preserved and on display at the Langlade County Historical Society Museum. A street in Antigo also bears his name. The city gained its charter in 1883.

In the early part of the 1900s, Antigo was best known for its sawmills. At the turn of the millennium, the city's economy had a balance of industry and agriculture. High on the list are potatoes, dairy products, fur, shoes, fertilizer, steel, and aluminum products, along with the lumber and wood product industries established in the earlier years.

On April 24, 2016, a former Antigo High School student shot two students with a rifle during prom. As he approached the school with a rifle a police officer who was already on the scene shot him. He later died at a Wausau hospital.

Geography 

The wide expanse of level land, the fine stand of timber and the fertility of the "Antigo Flats" soil soon attracted many settlers. Today, the Antigo Silt Loam soil is the state soil of Wisconsin.

Climate
Antigo has a cool humid continental climate (Köppen Dfb). Annually the temperature drops below 32 °F (0 °C) on 187 days, and below 0 °F (−17.8 °C) on 43 days. The daily mean temperatures of the winters in this region are associated with subarctic climates with frequent subzero temperatures, but due to the extended warm period of daily means above 50 °F (10 °C) from May to September it stays within the humid continental temperature range.

Demographics

2020 census
As of the census of 2020, there were 8,100 people, 3,694 households residing in the city. The racial makeup of the city was 95.2% White, 0.4% African American, 0.6% Native American and 2.8% from two or more races. Hispanic or Latino of any race were 2.9% of the population.

2010 census
As of the census of 2010, there were 8,234 people, 3,613 households, and 2,049 families residing in the city. The racial makeup of the city was 95.1% White, 0.5% African American, 1.4% Native American, 0.4% Asian, 0.8% from other races, and 1.7% from two or more races. Hispanic or Latino of any race were 2.7% of the population.

There were 3,613 households, of which 28.5% had children under the age of 18 living with them, 39.3% were married couples living together, 12.6% had a female householder with no husband present, 4.8% had a male householder with no wife present, and 43.3% were non-families. 37.1% of all households were made up of individuals, and 17.1% had someone living alone who was 65 years of age or older. The average household size was 2.21 and the average family size was 2.88.

2000 census
As of the census of 2000, there were 8,560 people, 3,630 households, and 2,221 families residing in the city. The population density was 1,328.7 people per square mile (513.2/km2). There were 3,938 housing units at an average density of 611.3 per square mile (236.1/km2). The racial makeup of the city was 97.27% White, 0.30% Black or African American, 0.86% Native American, 0.29% Asian, 0.01% Pacific Islander, 0.32% from other races, and 0.95% from two or more races. 1.20% of the population were Hispanic or Latino of any race.

There were 3,630 households, out of which 29.3% had children under the age of 18 living with them, 46.0% were married couples living together, 11.7% had a female householder with no husband present, and 38.8% were non-families. 34.1% of all households were made up of individuals, and 18.1% had someone living alone who was 65 years of age or older. The average household size was 2.29 and the average family size was 2.93.

In the city, the population was spread out, with 24.6% under the age of 18, 8.2% from 18 to 24, 25.7% from 25 to 44, 20.4% from 45 to 64, and 21.2% who were 65 years of age or older. The median age was 39 years. For every 100 females, there were 89.0 males. For every 100 females age 18 and over, there were 83.5 males.

The median income for a household in the city was $29,548, and the median income for a family was $40,883. Males had a median income of $29,932 versus $20,156 for females. The per capita income for the city was $16,592. About 10.2% of families and 13.2% of the population were below the poverty line, including 15.8% of those under age 18 and 12.2% of those age 65 or over.

Transportation

Highways

Airport
Antigo is served by the Langlade County Airport (KAIG). Located two miles northeast of the city, the airport handles approximately 8,250 operations per year, with roughly 97% general aviation, 2% air taxi and 1% military. The airport has a 4,010-foot asphalt runway with approved GPS approaches (Runway 17-35) and a 3,400-foot asphalt crosswind runway with GPS approaches (Runway 9-27).

Railroads
Antigo was formerly served by intercity passenger rail at Antigo Depot.

Education
Public schools in Antigo are administered by the Antigo Unified School District. Public schools within the city include: East Elementary School, North Elementary School, West Elementary School, Antigo Middle School, Antigo High School, and AIMS Academy.

In addition, there are two parochial schools in Antigo: Peace Lutheran School(K-8) and All Saints Catholic School (K-8).

Athletics
Antigo's high school football team, the Red Robins, won Division 1 state championships in 1976, 1978, and 1982. The Red Robins also won three state titles prior to the introduction of the WIAA tournament system in 1976. From 1920 to 2007, the school won 23 Wisconsin Valley Conference championships and six state titles from 1970 to 1982, including seven seasons in which the team did not lose a game.

The Red Robins' chief football rival is Rhinelander High School. Every year since 1935, the schools have played for Gene Shepard's Hodag Bell, donated by Mrs. E.S. Shepard from the SS Hodag, which sank in 1903. As of 2022, Antigo leads the series 56-30-2.

Culture
The Langlade County Museum is housed in the 1902 Carnegie library building on the corner of 7th Avenue and Superior Street. The building housed the Antigo Public Library from 1905 to 1997. The museum contains historical artifacts and archives of Langlade County and the City of Antigo.

Recreation
In Antigo and the surrounding area recreational activities include fishing, hunting, swimming, snowmobiling. The Kettlebowl ski area, in nearby Bryant, Wisconsin, provides downhill and cross country skiing opportunities. The Midwest Collegiate Hockey Association is in Antigo.

The Clara R McKenna Aquatic Center opened in 2005 on the site of Antigo High School, offers Antigo area residents a year-round recreation pool and lap pool.

The Langlade County fairgrounds, located in Antigo, has an indoor ice rink in winter and facilities for off-road racing and demolition derbies in summer. As well as Friday night stock car races, the National Anthem starts at 7 pm.

Notable people

 James A. Barker, Wisconsin state senator
 Clayton Bailey, sculptor
 Justin Berg, Chicago Cubs pitcher
 James Bradley, son of John Bradley, author of Flags of Our Fathers and Flyboys: A True Story of Courage
 John Bradley, navy corpsman who took part in the Raising the Flag on Iwo Jima
 Walter D. Cavers, Wisconsin state representative
 James Randall Durfee, U.S. federal court judge
 Clair Finch, Wisconsin state representative and lawyer
 Charles Gowan, former Antigo mayor
 Jon Hohman, professional football player 
 Daniel Hartl, Geneticist
 Paul E. Knapp, U.S. Air Force major general, Wisconsin state adjutant general
 George W. Latta, Wisconsin state representative
 Alfred J. Lauby, Wisconsin state representative
 D. Wayne Lukas, U.S. Racing Hall of Fame horse trainer
 Thomas Lynch, U.S. Representative
 Francis J. McCormick, NFL player
 Elmer Addison Morse, U.S. Representative
 Thomas D. Ourada, Wisconsin state representative
 Joe Piskula, Nashville Predators defenseman
 Burt W. Rynders, Wisconsin state representative and mayor of Antigo
 Ray Szmanda, radio and television personality/spokesperson
 Margaret Turnbull, astronomer, graduate of Antigo High School
 James M. Vande Hey, U.S. Air Force general
 Clair H. Voss, presiding judge of the Wisconsin Court of Appeals
 Clarence E. Wagner, mayor of Long Beach, California
 Eli Waste, Wisconsin state representative
 Sarah Waukau, Wisconsin state representative

Images

References

External links

 City of Antigo
 Antigo Public Library
 Sanborn fire insurance maps: 1889 1892 1898 1904 1909 1919

Cities in Wisconsin
Cities in Langlade County, Wisconsin
County seats in Wisconsin
1878 establishments in Wisconsin